St. Luke's Hospital was a psychiatric hospital in Clonmel, County Tipperary, Ireland.

History
The hospital which was designed by William Murray, opened as the Clonmel Asylum in January 1835. It became Clonmel Mental Hospital in the 1920s and went on to become St. Luke's Hospital in the 1950s. After the introduction of deinstitutionalisation in the late 1980s the hospital went into a period of decline and, following the publication of a highly critical report in 2009, the hospital closed in December 2012.

References

Further reading

Hospitals in County Tipperary
Lukes
Hospital buildings completed in 1835
1835 establishments in Ireland
Hospitals established in 1835
Defunct hospitals in the Republic of Ireland
2012 disestablishments in Ireland
Hospitals disestablished in 2012